The Central Sava Valley is a valley in the Sava Hills and a geographic region along the Sava in central Slovenia, now constituting the Central Sava Statistical Region. The region consists of three municipalities: Zagorje ob Savi, Trbovlje, and Hrastnik. Several coal mines operated in the Central Sava Valley, although all except the Trbovlje–Hrastnik Mine are now defunct.

History
The Slovene term Zasavje for this area is a recent coinage that did not come into general use until the 1920s, with the western part of the region being part of Carniola and its eastern part (Trbovlje and Hrastnik) belonging to Styria. Due to its coalmining tradition, it was one of the first regions in today's Slovenia to be industrialized in the 19th century. Construction of the Austrian Southern Railway, which led from Vienna to Trieste through Slovenia and the Central Sava Valley in 1849, was a major milestone.

Notes

References

External links

Historical regions in Slovenia
Sava basin
Valleys of Slovenia